The New Straits Times Press (Malaysia) Berhad (NSTP) is a Malaysian conglomerate of publishing companies, owned by Media Prima. The NSTP publishes several newspapers, including the New Straits Times, Berita Harian and Harian Metro.

History
The "New Straits Times Press" (initially  Straits Times Press Sdn Bhd) was formed by the directors of the Directors of the Straits Times Press (Malaysia) Berhad, in a desire to meet the reasonable aspirations of Malaysians to have a majority shareholding in the company which produced the largest mass-circulation organ in the territories of East and West Malaysia.

The Malaysia operations of the Straits Times, the Sunday Times, the Malay Mail, the Sunday Mail, Berita Harian and Berita Minggu were transferred to this new company. An agreement was reached in 1972 between the directors of the Straits Times group and Tengku Razaleigh Hamzah for the disposal of 80 per cent of the stock of the New Straits Times Press (Malaysia) Sdn. Bhd. for the Malaysian interest.

The company joined up with three others to establish Malaysian Newsprint Industries in 1996, with the mill in Mentakab starting production in April 1999.

NSTP announced in December 2019 that they will lay off 543 workers while bureaus were reduced into five effective 12 March 2020.

Branch offices

 Kompleks Alor Setar, Alor Setar, Kedah
 Northam Road, George Town, Penang
 Bangunan Seri Kinta, Ipoh, Perak
 Putrajaya
 Kemayan Square, Seremban, Negeri Sembilan
 Taman Melaka Raya, Malacca City, Malacca
 Muar, Johor
 Summit Signature Hotel, Batu Pahat, Johor
 Bandar Baru UDA, Johor Bahru, Johor
 Kuantan, Pahang
 Kuala Terengganu, Terengganu
 Kota Bharu, Kelantan
 Kuching, Sarawak
 Villa Tropicana Commercial Centre, Kota Kinabalu, Sabah

Printing Plant
 Balai Berita Shah Alam, Bukit Jelutong Industrial Park, Shah Alam, Selangor

See also
 The Utusan Group - NSTP's main competitor

References

External links
 Official website
 Company Overview of The New Straits Times Press (Malaysia) Berhad, bloomberg.com
 The New Straits Times Press (Malaysia) Berhad (MYX: 3999), bursamalaysia.com

Conglomerate companies of Malaysia
Media Prima
Newspaper companies of Malaysia
1973 establishments in Malaysia
Publishing companies established in 1973
Companies formerly listed on Bursa Malaysia
Privately held companies of Malaysia